The 2007–08 season was the sixth and final season for Gretna in the Scottish Football League, and Gretna's only season in the Scottish Premier League.  The club dissolved at the end of the season.

Players

Gretna's final squad
The squad given here is made up of the players registered to the club on the date of Gretna F.C.'s final league match (Gretna 1–0 Hearts, 14 May 2008).

Left club during season

Youth team

Competitions

Scottish Premier League

Final table

Scottish League Cup

Scottish Cup

References

Gretna F.C. seasons
Gretna